Javier Hernández, also known by his nickname Chicharito (Mexican Spanish: little pea), is a professional association football player who has represented Mexico (nicknamed "El Tri") in international competition since 2009. He is the country's all-time top scorer with 52 goals in 109 appearances for El Tri, . Hernández plays primarily as a "goal poacher", with most of his goals from close-range and within the penalty area, and is Mexico's star player.

Hernández found club success with C.D. Guadalajara in Liga MX, where his grandfather played and his father coached. He was called up to the national team and made his debut alongside four other players on 30 September 2009 in a friendly match against Colombia, assisting on Mexico's sole goal during the 2–1 loss in Dallas, Texas, United States. He scored his first two goals in his second appearance, a 5–0 friendly win over Bolivia on 24 February 2010 in San Francisco, California, United States. Hernández was called into Mexico's squad for the 2010 FIFA World Cup, where he scored two goals against France and Argentina. His first goal against France mirrored his grandfather Tomás Balcázar's debut at the 1954 FIFA World Cup, also against France and at the same age of 22. He scored his first international hat-trick against El Salvador during the 2011 CONCACAF Gold Cup in the United States and finished the tournament as the top goalscorer, with seven goals, and was named the most valuable player after Mexico's victory.

Hernández went on to score three goals at the 2013 FIFA Confederations Cup against Italy and Japan, but struggled to score in subsequent friendlies and World Cup qualification matches. He was not chosen to start at the 2014 FIFA World Cup, but did score one goal as a substitute against Croatia to help Mexico qualify for the knockout rounds. By the following spring, Hernández had scored goals during several friendlies, but was ruled out of the 2015 CONCACAF Gold Cup due to a shoulder injury. He returned to the national team for the 2015 CONCACAF Cup, a special one-match tournament against the United States to determine qualification for 2017 FIFA Confederations Cup; Mexico won the match 3–2, with Hernández scoring the first goal of the match and his first against the United States.

Hernández scored one goal for Mexico at the Copa América Centenario in 2016, during a group stage match against Jamaica, and came within one goal of tying the all-time goal-scoring record for Mexico. He tied Jared Borgetti's record of 46 goals on 24 March 2017, during a 2–0 victory over Costa Rica in World Cup qualification. Both players reached 46 goals in 89 appearances, but Hernández had reached earlier milestones of 20, 30, and 40 goals faster than any other Mexican player. He surpassed Borgetti's record on 27 May 2017, during a friendly against Croatia in Los Angeles that Mexico lost 2–1. Hernández became the first Mexican player to score 50 international goals on 23 June 2018, during a group stage match at the 2018 FIFA World Cup against South Korea. He also became the third Mexican player to score in three different World Cups, after Cuauhtémoc Blanco and Rafael Márquez, and tied Luis Hernández's record for most total goals at the World Cup.

International goals
"Score" represents the score in the match after Hernández's goal. "Score" and "Result" list Mexico's goal tally first. .

Statistics

By year

By competition

See also
List of men's footballers with 50 or more international goals

References

Hernandez, Javier
Mexico national football team
Association football in Mexico lists